Tintangel is a novel by Paul H. Cook published in 1981.

Plot summary
Tintagel is a novel in which people who get lost in music disappear and appear in a parallel universe.

Reception
Greg Costikyan reviewed Tintagel in Ares Magazine #13 and commented that "I cannot blankly approve or disapprove Tintagel. I enjoyed reading it, but it contains a number of logical errors – and never seems quite to click."

Reviews
Review by Tom Easton (1982) in Analog Science Fiction/Science Fact, June 1982 
Review by David Truesdale (1983) in Thrust, #19, Winter/Spring 1983

References

1981 novels